Nong Fa Lake or Nongphatom Lake ('Blue Lake') is a volcanic crater lake in the mountains of Sanxay District, Attapeu Province, southeastern Laos, in the Dong Ampham National Biodiversity Conservation Area, about 12 kilometres from the Vietnamese border. At an elevation of 1154 metres, the maximum depth of the lake is reportedly 78 metres, although locals have claimed that the depth is unknown, having attempted fruitlessly to gauge the depth with bamboo poles.

Lonely Planet describes it as "magical", a beautiful volcanic lake, similar to but larger than Yeak Lorn in Cambodia's Ratanakiri Province. During the Vietnam War it was used by the North Vietnamese as a rest stop for soldiers hurt on the Ho Chi Minh Trail, as well as US pilots recorded it as a navigation point and called it "Dollar Lake" because it was round.

The lake is shrouded in legend, and Laotians refrain from bathing in it because they believe it is inhabited by a giant snake-pig who will devour bathers. The hill tribes in the area say that if you do swim in the waters you will have eternal youth.

References

Lakes of Laos
Geography of Attapeu province